Spontaneous conception is the conception and birth of a subsequent child, after the birth of a child conceived through in vitro fertilisation or other forms of assisted reproductive technology.  There is an overall 18% chance of spontaneous conception after an in vitro fertilization (IVF) treatment, but that chance rose to 37% among younger women (less than 27 years). The likelihood also depends on the sperm performance of the man and the egg count of the woman.

References

Infertility
Gynaecology
Human pregnancy